Denis Browne (1763 – 14 August 1828) was an Irish politician.

Life
Browne was the second son of two sons and four daughters born to Peter Browne, 2nd Earl of Altamont and Elizabeth Kelly of Lisduffe, County Galway. He was born and raised at the family home of Westport House, County Mayo. He was a direct descendant of the pirate, Grace O'Malley (c.1530-c.1603). The Browne Family being one of the ancient Tribes of Galway and had been originally Catholic before conversion to the Church of Ireland.

Browne served as an officer in the 5th Royal Irish Dragoons from 1779 to 1784. Due to his brother's influence and the support of the Irish catholic interest, he was elected M.P. for County Mayo in 1782, which he would hold till 1800. His uncle, James Browne, Prime Sergeant, was dismissed in 1782 which led to the brothers going into opposition against the government. In time, they were conciliated by the Duke of Rutland's administration. Browne was appointed to the privy council on 20 January 1794.

Browne supported catholic emancipation but would not help the Catholic Committee in organising elections in the county; Wolfe Tone believed this was because Browne was unwilling to lose any influence in his locality. On the other hand, Browne and his brother supported the government, keeping the administration in Dublin well informed of events in Mayo in the years prior to the Irish Rebellion of 1798. In 1795 the brothers assisted over five hundred Ulster families who fled to Mayo in the wake of disturbances arising from the Battle of the Diamond. All the refugees were carefully questioned to root out any disaffected elements, the families settling on the family estates.

He was appointed High Sheriff of Mayo for 1798, the year of the Irish Rebellion. He acquired the nickname Denis the Rope in the aftermath of the French invasion of Mayo in that year for his zeal in hanging suspected rebels. His own home in Claremorris was destroyed by the rebels. Browne had a well-earned reputation as a feared duelist. While Sheriff, he fought against George Robert FitzGerald; another, during the election of 1790, against his electoral opponent, John Bingham. In 1801 he fought against another parliamentary opponent, won, and was returned unopposed for County Mayo.

Browne's subsequent support for the Acts of Union 1800 failed to gain him a peerage, though his brother was made first Marquess of Sligo. In the following decades he represented Mayo (1800–1818) and Kilkenny city (1820–26), strongly supporting military coercion in Ireland. However, he was still a supporter of catholic emancipation.

Family
He married his cousin Anne Mahon (died 1833) of Castlegar, County Galway, in 1790, having five sons and four daughters. Two of his sons, James and Peter, also served in the commons from the 1820s. He was instrumental in securing the election of his cousin, Dominick Browne, 1st Baron Oranmore and Browne, supposedly encouraging him to fight a duel to gain votes (Martyn, 2001).

He died at his home in Claremorris. A portrait of him by Sir Joshua Reynolds hangs in Westport House.

References
 Westport House and the Brownes, Denis Browne, Westport, 1981
 Land and popular politics in Ireland: Co. Mayo from plantation to the land war, Donald Jordan, 1994
 The Tribes of Galway, Adrian James Martyn, Galway, 2001
 Dictionary of Irish Biography, pp. 902–03, Cambridge, 2010

External links 
 

1763 births
1828 deaths
Politicians from County Mayo
High Sheriffs of Mayo
5th Royal Irish Lancers officers
Irish duellists
Younger sons of earls
Denis
Members of the Privy Council of Ireland
Irish MPs 1776–1783
Irish MPs 1783–1790
Irish MPs 1790–1797
Irish MPs 1798–1800
Members of the Parliament of the United Kingdom for County Mayo constituencies (1801–1922)
UK MPs 1801–1802
UK MPs 1802–1806
UK MPs 1807–1812
UK MPs 1812–1818
UK MPs 1820–1826
Members of the Parliament of Ireland (pre-1801) for County Mayo constituencies